Moncrivello is a comune (municipality) in the Province of Vercelli in the Italian region Piedmont, located about  northeast of Turin and about 35 km west of Vercelli.

It is home to a medieval castle which was a residence of Yolande of Valois, duchess of Savoy and daughter of Charles VII of France, in the 15th century.

References

External links
 Official website

Cities and towns in Piedmont